Pearl Sindelar (born Pearl Evelyn Tinker; February 5, 1881 – July 9, 1958) was an American silent film actress.

Early life and education 
Pearl Evelyn Tinker was from Virginia City, Nevada, the daughter of William Wallace Tinker and Mollie McCarty Tinker. Her father was a miner. Her mother, who used the stage name "Mae Evelynne", was the daughter of lawyer and adventurer John Templeton McCarty. Pearl Tinker was raised by her mother after her parents divorced in 1885. She briefly attended Snell Seminary in Oakland, California, but soon joined her mother on the vaudeville stage, at first in child roles, as "Pearl Evelynne".

Career 
Pearl Sindelar starred on stage in the musical The Girl in the Taxi (1910) before she started in silent films. She also appeared in Potash and Perlmutter (1914), and Hospitality (1922). She was active in union organizing in the New York theatre professions, and participated in the Actors' Equity strike of 1919. She also wrote an unpublished memoir of the strike.

After her stage and film career ended, Sindelar became interested in spirituality, especially the "I AM" movement of self-proclaimed prophet Guy Ballard and his wife, Edna Anne Wheeler Ballard. She and her husband joined Ballard's congregation in Los Angeles, and taught classes on "divine ascension" and other topics. She gave the eulogy at the funeral of film director Lois Weber.

When the church's activities were investigated, Pearl and Charles Sindelar were charged with mail fraud, along with other church leaders. They were acquitted in January 1941, and resigned their church positions soon after.

Personal life 
Pearl Tinker married actor and artist Charles Sindelar in 1902. She was widowed when Charles died in 1947. She died in Glendale, California in 1958.

Filmography
Cleopatra (1912)
The Wrong Bottle (1913)*short
Innocence (1913)*short
The Italian Bride (1913)*short
The Crooked Bankers (1913)*short
Puttin' It Over on Papa (1913)*short
The Governor's Double (1913)*short
When a Woman Wastes (1913)*short
The Turning Point (1913)*short
The Depth of Hate (1913)*short
Two Mothers (1913)*short
A Scandinavian Scandal(1913)*short
The Resurrection (1914)*short
Broken Lives (1914)*short
The Second Generation (1914)*short
The Wasted Years (1914)*short
A Leech of the Industry (1914)*short
Detective Craig's Coup (1914)
Jolts of Jealousy (1914)*short
The Glimpses of the Moon (1923)
Pied Piper Malone (1923)
Peter Stuyvesant (1924)*short
A Made-to-Order Hero (1927)*short
The Four-Footed Ranger (1928)

References

External links

1958 deaths
Actresses from Nevada
People from Virginia City, Nevada
1881 births
Vaudeville performers
American silent film actresses
20th-century American actresses